Lake Sünnet Nature Park is a nature park declared protected area at Lake Sünnet in Bolu Province, northwestern Turkey.

in Bolu Province. It was formed by landslide in a narrow and deep valley between Kurudağ and Erenler Hill. The lake is fed by creeks and springs around.

An -area at the lake was registered as  A-grade Forest Recreational Area in 1973. On July 11, 2011, the area was declared a nature park by the Ministry of Environment and Forest.

The nature park offers outdoor recreational activities like hiking, biking and picnicking.

A hotel with 45 rooms and 115 beds, a restaurant, an outdoor coffeehouse and a sport court are available at the nature park.

References

Sunnet
Sunnet
Nature parks in Turkey
Landforms of Bolu Province
Protected areas established in 2011
2011 establishments in Turkey
Göynük District